Trinity University is a private liberal arts college in San Antonio, Texas. Founded in 1869, its student body consists of about 2,600 undergraduate and 200 graduate students. Trinity offers 49 majors and 61 minors among six degree programs, and has an endowment of $1.725 billion.

Trinity is a member institution of the Annapolis Group, a consortium of national independent colleges that share a commitment to liberal arts values and education, and the Associated Colleges of the South, 16 southern liberal arts colleges that collaborate on staff and curricular enhancements.

History 

Cumberland Presbyterians founded Trinity in 1869 in Tehuacana, Texas,  from the remnants of three small Cumberland Presbyterian colleges that had lost significant enrollment during the Civil War. John Boyd, who had served in the Congress of the Republic of Texas from 1836 to 1845 and in the Texas Senate from 1862 to 1863, donated 1,100 acres of land and financial assistance to establish the new university.

Believing that the school needed the support of a larger community, the university moved in 1902 to Waxahachie, Texas. In 1906, the university, along with many Cumberland Presbyterian churches, affiliated with the United Presbyterian Church. The Stock Market Crash of 1929, however, severely hindered the university's growth. Enrollment declined sharply, indebtedness and faculty attrition mounted, and trustees began using endowment funds to maintain daily operations. Consequently, the Southern Association of Colleges and Schools placed Trinity's accreditation status on probation in 1936, jeopardizing its future. Once again, its leaders began to consider relocation to a larger community to improve the university's viability.

Meanwhile, in 1942, the Methodist-affiliated University of San Antonio was failing. San Antonio community leaders, who wished to maintain a Protestant-affiliated college in the city, approached Trinity with a relocation offer. The university left Waxahachie and took over the campus and alumni of the University of San Antonio. (The old Waxahachie campus is currently home to Southwestern Assemblies of God University). For the next decade, the Woodlawn campus, on the city's near-west side, was Trinity's home while it developed a permanent home. Lacking adequate facilities, the university functioned by using military barracks and quonset huts to house students and to provide library and classroom space.

In 1945, Trinity acquired a former limestone quarry for a new campus and hired Texas architect O'Neil Ford to design a master plan and many of the buildings. Construction began in 1950, and the current campus opened in 1952.

When it moved, the campus was largely undeveloped (one classroom building, one dorm, and a nearly empty library were the only completed buildings). Yet, under the leadership of Dr. James W. Laurie, the university's 14th president, Trinity took advantage of its new location in a rapidly growing major urban center to grow in academic stature.  Dr. Laurie was responsible for drastically increasing Trinity's endowment, largely funded by the James A. and Leta M. Chapman Charitable Trust of Tulsa, Oklahoma.  The stronger endowment allowed Trinity to construct a new, modern campus on its “University on the Hill” location and to increase the quality and range of its faculty while maintaining a high faculty to student ratio. In 1969, Trinity entered into a covenant agreement with the regional synod of the Presbyterian Church (USA) that affirmed historical connections, but transformed Trinity into a private, independent university with a self-perpetuating board of trustees. The campus continues to be a "historically connected" member of the Association of Presbyterian Colleges and Universities.

Trinity's growth continued under Ronald Calgaard, who followed Laurie's successor, Duncan Wimpress. Under Dr. Calgaard, the university implemented a number of changes to raise its profile. For example, Trinity transformed into a residential undergraduate school, requiring all freshmen to live on campus and cutting the number of master's programs offered from more than 20 to four. Also, Trinity decreased its student population from about 3,300 to 3,000 (and eventually to 2,700), increased merit scholarships, increased the focus on national student recruitment, and began scheduling a strong series of speakers and cultural events open to the public.

Calgaard's successor, John R. Brazil, focused on replacing outdated campus buildings and improving the school's financial resources.  The "Campaign for Trinity University", which launched in September 2005, sought to raise US$200 million for a variety of purposes.  At its conclusion on September 25, 2009, the campaign raised $205.9 million, surpassing the original goal. Dr. Brazil served as Trinity's president through January 2010. Upon announcement of his retirement, the board of trustees awarded him its Distinguished Service Award, Trinity's most prestigious honor.

Dennis A. Ahlburg served as president from January 2010 to January 2015. During Ahlburg's presidency, Trinity developed and executed a strategic plan to shape the future of the university. Academically, Trinity refined its curriculum to further define a liberal arts education, developed an entrepreneurship program, and realigned the business program.  Trinity also refocused its marketing to raise the university's national profile. Finally, under Ahlburg, Trinity built the Center for Sciences and Innovation, which modernized and combined science facilities to ease collaboration across disciplines.

Danny J. Anderson, a Latin American literature scholar and dean of the College of Liberal Arts and Sciences at the University of Kansas, succeeded Ahlburg as president in May 2015, serving until May 31, 2022.  During his tenure, improvements included the construction of Dicke Hall, home for Humanities studies; transformation of the Halsell Center into a modern learning environment, and creation of the Michael Neidorff School of Business, an AACSB-accredited undergraduate business school.  The school was named a National Historic District during Anderson's tenure.  Anderson also implemented several initiatives aimed at increasing the school's inclusivity, and by the end of his term 40% of Trinity's student body came from underrepresented backgrounds.

Vanessa Beasley, former vice provost for academic affairs, dean of residential faculty, and associate professor of communication studies at Vanderbilt University was named as Anderson's successor on May 31, 2022.  She will be the first female to lead Trinity and will begin her term at the beginning of the 2022–23 school year.  Megan Mustain, provost and vice president for Academic Affairs, will act as interim University president until then.

Campus 
Trinity overlooks downtown San Antonio and is adjacent to the Monte Vista Historic District and just south of the cities of Olmos Park and Alamo Heights. The  Skyline Campus, the university's fourth location, is noted for its distinctive red-brick architecture and well-maintained grounds, modeled after an Italian village, by late architect O'Neil Ford.

Sustainability 
The environmental movement at Trinity is known as Red Bricks, Green Campus. Trinity is a member of the Presidents' Climate Commitment and is actively working toward carbon neutrality. Trinity was ranked fifth in the RecycleMania Challenge. Students pushed for fair-trade options, and now all coffee sold at the university is certified fair trade. In 2011, Trinity University scored a B− on the College Sustainability Report Card, also known as the Green Report Card.

Miller Residence Hall, home to first-year students at Trinity University, was renovated and updated in 2010, earning gold Leadership in Energy and Environmental Design (LEED) certification by the U.S. Green Building Council in the process. In addition, Calvert Hall, the Thomas-Lightner complex, and The Center for the Sciences and Innovation have been registered with the Green Building Council's LEED program and are awaiting certification.

Strategic plan 
In 2011, Trinity undertook the development of a comprehensive 10-year strategic plan, Trinity Tomorrow, to ensure the long-term sustainability of the university. The board of trustees approved the plan in May 2013, which details four strategic objectives:
Strengthen opportunities for experiential learning
Foster productive collisions as a defining characteristic
Enhance students international engagement and awareness
Maximize the educational and personal benefits of a residential liberal arts university

and four foundations to achieve them:
Strengthen market position and improve student recruitment
Be an innovative leader for excellence in teaching and research
Improve alumni relations, engagement, and giving
Build the infrastructure to support a 21st-century university

Administrators have begun enacting the details of the plan with positive outcomes. Among other highlights, Trinity:
adopted a new curriculum
increased its marketing locally and nationally 
launched centers to focus on college success, experiential learning and career preparedness, and international citizenship and
launched the Tiger Network to increase access to campus events via the Internet

Notable buildings and structures 

It was previously the highest point in San Antonio. The tower is now lit at night (excepting evenings when the lighting interferes with on-campus astronomical observances), a tradition begun on September 22, 2002, to commemorate Trinity's 60th anniversary in San Antonio.

 Laurie Auditorium seats 2,865 and hosts both campus and community events. The university has many lecture series, such as the high-profile Trinity Distinguished Lecture Series, Stieren Arts Enrichment Series, Nobel Economists Lecture Series, and Flora Cameron Lecture on Politics and Public Affairs.

 The  Elizabeth Huth Coates Library houses more than 1 million books and bound periodical volumes. The library, an advanced facility for a school of Trinity's size, also houses over 200,000 volumes of government documents, over 1.3 million microforms, over 65,000 media items, and maintains 2,400 periodical subscriptions and access to over 20,000 electronic periodicals. The library's annual acquisition budget is over US$1.8 million. 
 In 2006, the Ruth Taylor Fine Arts Center, consisting of the Jim and Janet Dicke Art Building, the Campbell and Eloise Smith Music Building, and the Ruth Taylor Recital Hall was substantially renovated under the guidance of Kell Muñoz Architects, providing 20,000 additional square feet of space. The building subsequently won a merit award for design from the City of San Antonio in 2008.

The Center for Sciences and Innovation (CSI), completed in 2014, modernized the university's science, engineering, and laboratory facilities and helped ease collaboration across disciplines. Renovations to connect existing buildings allow for a 300,000 square-foot science facility. The complex, certified LEED Gold, features a rooftop observatory, a living “green” roof and rooftop greenhouse, and an open-air innovation and design studio. The new building helped Trinity earn a top-five ranking in the Princeton Review for best science lab facilities.
 The Margarite B. Parker Chapel seats six hundred and is known for its large Hofmann-Ballard pipe organ, the largest pipe organ in South Texas, comprising 5 divisions, 102 stops, 112 ranks, and over 6,000 pipes. A state-of-the-art four-manual console was installed in summer 2007, with the aid of the university's Calvert Trust Fund. Non-denominational services are led by the campus chaplain Sunday evenings.
 In the Fall 2022, Trinity opened its latest building, Dicke Hall, which houses the Humanities Collective, the English Department, and the Religion Department.  The building is 3 stories with 40,000 square feet, 6 classrooms, and 1 lecture hall. It was designed by the San Antonio architectural firm Lake Flato using a mass-timber structural system also known as Engineered wood.

Academics and rankings 

As defined by the Carnegie Foundation's classification, Trinity University is a small, highly residential university with a majority of enrollments coming from undergraduate students. The full-time, four-year undergraduate program is classified as "more selective, lower transfer-in" and has an arts and sciences focus with some graduate student coexistence. Trinity is accredited by the Southern Association of Colleges and Schools and is a member of the Phi Beta Kappa Society. Full-time undergraduate tuition is $44,680 for the 2019–20 academic year; room and board are an additional $13,584.

Academics 
Trinity offers 47 majors and 59 minors in the traditional liberal arts, business, sciences, fine arts, and engineering, and graduate programs in accounting, teaching, school psychology, school administration, and health care administration and is the only university in San Antonio to offer a minor in creative writing. Trinity stresses close interaction between students and faculty members across all disciplines, with a 9:1 student/faculty ratio. The full-time faculty numbers 228, 98% of whom hold a Ph.D. or other terminal degree in their field.  About 47% of the student body has studied abroad in over 35 countries.

Its most popular undergraduate majors, based on 2021 graduates, were:
Research and Experimental Psychology (47)
Accounting (34)
Computer and Information Sciences (30)
Neuroscience (28)
Engineering Science
Finance (27)
Economics (27)

All undergraduates must demonstrate proficiency across a broad range of academic disciplines, regardless of major. At its core, the Common Curriculum provides the liberal arts foundation for all undergraduate degrees awarded by Trinity. The Common Curriculum consists of the following components:

The First-Year Experience (FYE) Program
Starting in fall 2015, all first-year students must complete a 6-credit hour course in their first semester that meets five days a week. The FYE consists of a writing workshop, discussion seminar, and a common day where everyone from the different sections meet for guest speakers, student conferences, or library sessions to assist students in the research process.

Foreign Language, Computer, and Mathematics Skills
Foreign Languages 
Trinity students must reach a minimum level of competence corresponding to that attained after successful completion of the first semester of the second year of college foreign language study. An international baccalaureate course at higher level with a 6 or 7 or an AP language test score of 3 or higher will suffice in most cases.  
Computer Skills
Students must be able to use computers to collect, organize, analyze and communicate information in an academic environment. Students who do not pass a test demonstrating these competencies must fulfill this requirement by completing an approved course built around these criteria.
Mathematics 
Trinity requires completion of three years of high school mathematics, including either trigonometry or precalculus, for admission as a first-year student. While there is no further requirement, all students are urged to undertake further study of mathematics at Trinity.

40 percent of students attend graduate school immediately after earning their bachelor's, and 65 percent of all students attend within five years of graduation.

An analysis by the Office of Institutional Research indicated that Trinity has made considerable progress in the number of graduates going on to earn doctoral degrees. Of students earning a bachelor's between 1982 and 1986, 2.9% went on to earn doctorates; of those earning a bachelor's between 1997 and 2001, 8.5% had. Trinity improved its ranking in this category from 328th to 38th among other colleges and universities.

Rankings 

Trinity was ranked 1st overall in the West in U.S. News & World Report's 2021 "Regional University" rankings, 2nd for "Best Value", tied for 3rd for "Best Undergraduate Teaching", tied for 8th for "Most Innovative", and tied for 117th for "Top Performers on Social Mobility". Its undergraduate engineering program was ranked tied for 33rd out of 220 schools in the U.S. where doctorates are not offered. 
Washington Monthly ranked Trinity 7th out of 614 master's universities in 2020 for “promoting the public good,” based on social mobility, research, and civic engagement.
Kiplinger's Personal Finance places Trinity 37th in its 2019 ranking of 177 best value private universities in the United States.  
Forbes ranks Trinity 110th nationally in its 2021 rankings of 650 colleges and universities. Forbes evaluates a college investment from a consumer perspective, focusing on the quality of teaching, career prospects, graduation rates, and levels of debt at graduation.
The Princeton Review recognized Trinity in its 2017 edition of The Best 381 Colleges, its annual college guide, and has been featured in the guide since its first publication.

Student body and admissions 

Trinity's 2,582 undergraduate students come from 49 U.S. states plus 48 countries. Students of color account for 38.9 percent of undergraduate students. 72 percent of the undergraduate student body is from Texas; the next six states represented are California, Colorado, Louisiana, Arizona, and Missouri/Oregon.

The admissions office received 9,626 applications for the class of 2025 and accepted 34%.  Test scores for the enrolled class of 2025 were 1300-1450 for the SAT and 29-33 for the ACT and 78 percent ranked in the top 20% of their high school graduating class.

Approximately 98 percent of the student body receives financial aid.

Student life

Greek life 

Trinity hosts fourteen Greek organizations, seven fraternities and seven sororities. U.S. News & World Report estimates that 14% of men and 19% of women were members, or about 17% of total undergraduate enrollment. The current fraternities and sororities are as follows:

Fraternities:
 Bengal Lancers
 Chi Delta Tau
 Iota Chi Rho
 Kappa Kappa Delta
 Omega Phi
 Phi Sigma Chi
 Triniteers

Sororities:
 Alpha Chi Lambda
 Chi Beta Epsilon
 Gamma Chi Delta
 Phi Delta Kappa
 Sigma Theta Tau
 Spurs
 Zeta Chi

On occasion, fraternities and sororities have been mired in conflict at Trinity. In 1991, the New York Times reported that Trinity had discontinued campus Greek organizations right to pledge new members as a result of being in violation of the university's alcohol use policy. In 2012, two fraternities and two sororities had their charters temporarily revoked for hazing violations. These violations were said to have taken place over many years.

Activities

Student media 

Trinity's radio station, KRTU-FM, broadcasts jazz during the day, and indie rock overnight. TigerTV serves as the campus TV station.  In addition to movies, the channel broadcasts three main shows: Newswave, Studio 21, and the Not So Late Show. The Trinitonian has been the weekly campus newspaper for 103 years, and has a print circulation of 2,500.

Athletics 

The Trinity Tigers is the nickname for the sports teams of Trinity University. They participate in the NCAA's Division III and the Southern Collegiate Athletic Conference (SCAC).  The school mascot is LeeRoy, a Bengal tiger.  In the 1950s, LeeRoy was an actual tiger who was brought to sporting events, but today LeeRoy is portrayed by a student wearing a tiger suit.

Trinity fields strong teams, evidenced by its finishes in the National Association of Collegiate Directors of Athletics (NACDA) Learfield Directors' Cup, which recognizes the strength of athletic programs by division. Since the Directors' Cup inception in 1995, Trinity has finished in the top 10 on five occasions out of over 400 Division Ill programs; it finished 31st in 2017–18.

Trinity has historically had a strong tennis program. In 1963, Al G. Hill, Jr, grandson of oilman H L Hunt, entered as a Freshman Tennis Player.  When he graduated in 1967 as Tiger Captain, the College Tennis Courts were named after him. Under the tutelage of Coach Clarence Mabry, Trinity Player Chuck McKinley won the Wimbledon Singles Championship in 1963 and was rated the #1 men's Singles Player in the World. With partner Dennis Ralston, McKinley won the US Men's Doubles Championship in 1961, 1963, and 1964. McKinley and Ralston also played all of the matches while winning the Davis Cup for the US in 1963.  All of these accomplishments occurred while McKinley was a Trinity undergraduate.

In 1970, as a freshman at Trinity, Brian Gottfried won the USTA boys 18s Singles Championship, as well as the Doubles Championship with Alexander Mayer. In 1972 Trinity won the NCAA Division I Men's Tennis Championship. The Tiger Captain that year, Dick Stockton, won the NCAA Men's Singles Championship. The Women's Team won the NCAA Collegiate National championship in 1968, 1969, 1973, 1975, and 1976. As recently as 2000, the men's and women's programs each won NCAA Division III National Championships.

In the 2007 Trinity v. Millsaps football game on October 27, 2007, trailing by two points with two seconds left, the Tigers used 15 laterals covering 60 yards for a touchdown to give Trinity the win as time expired.  The unlikely play was named the top sports moment of the year by Time Magazine as well as the "Game Changing Performance of the Year" by Pontiac.

In November 2015, Trinity and Austin College announced they would affiliate with the Southern Athletic Association for football in 2017. This alliance renews a relationship that ended when the SAA schools split from the SCAC. As a result, the SCAC will no longer offer football as a sport.

In May 2016, the Trinity Baseball Team won the Division III College World Series in a best-of-three format, beating Keystone College 14–6 in game 1 and 10–7 in game 2. Trinity defeated the 2015 champion, SUNY Cortland twice in the bracket rounds of the tournament en route to the championship.

Trinity also has won national championships in women's basketball (spring 2003) and men's soccer (fall 2003). Club sports include men's and women's tennis, lacrosse, water polo, fencing, ultimate frisbee, and trap and skeet.

Notable people

References

External links 

 

 
Educational institutions established in 1869
Universities and colleges in San Antonio
Universities and colleges accredited by the Southern Association of Colleges and Schools
Universities and colleges affiliated with the Presbyterian Church (USA)
1869 establishments in Texas
Private universities and colleges in Texas